The Lyceum Theatre was a theatre in New York City located on Fourth Avenue (now Park Avenue South) between 23rd and 24th Streets in Manhattan. It was built in 1885 and operated until 1902, when it was torn down to make way for the Metropolitan Life Insurance Company Tower. It was replaced by a new Lyceum Theatre on 45th Street. For most of its existence, the theatre was home to Daniel Frohman's Lyceum Theatre Stock Company, which presented many important plays and actors of the day.

Building
Thomas Edison is reported to have personally worked on making it the first theatre lit entirely by electricity (not the first to use electric lights), and Louis Comfort Tiffany designed aspects of the interior. Not all new technologies lasted: for the first season the orchestra rode an "automatic elevator car" into the fly gallery to play in a gallery over the proscenium during performances, but the car was removed in the theatre's second year. Ticket prices initially ranged from $1 to $2.50.

Origins
Actor, playwright and theatre technology innovator Steele Mackaye and producer Gustave Frohman built the theatre as the base for the Lyceum School of Acting, to be run by them and Franklin H. Sargent. The school quickly became the New York School of Acting and then, by 1888, the American Academy of Dramatic Arts (AADA). Sargent soon left and after six months Mackaye and Frohman were forced to sell their interests to benefit Tiffany and other creditors. Actress Helen Dauvray then became manager, making her one of the first woman theatrical executives in the U.S. Gustave's brother, the impresario Daniel Frohman, took over at the beginning of the theatre's third season and stayed until it was demolished in 1902, when he established the Lyceum Theatre on 45th St.

Lyceum Theatre Stock Company
Daniel Frohman ran the Lyceum Theatre Company, a stock company with a more or less constant troupe of actors performing several different plays each season. Frohman sought to introduce as many new, “modern plays” as possible. The plays reflected both the older melodrama style and the newer naturalistic or realistic style, common to the last decades before the motion picture era. The Lyceum Company also sent productions on the road with full complements of actors, sets, musicians, crew, and publicists. (Prior to this, lead actors tended to tour alone and work with local actors and musicians, with results of varying artistic quality.) From 1886 until 1890, David Belasco worked for the Lyceum Company as stage manager (in today's terms, director or artistic director), co-wrote three of the company's productions with Henry Churchill de Mille, and taught at the acting school. In January 1899, three years before the old Lyceum shut down, Daniel Frohman moved the Lyceum Theatre Company to Daly's Theatre. He and his brother Charles Frohman continued to produce plays at the Lyceum after the stock company moved.

Actors
Lyceum productions featured top American and English actors. Many later appeared in silent films.

W.C. Bellows
William Courtleigh
Rowland Buckstone
Georgia Cayvan
Helen Dauvray
James K. Hackett
Virginia Harned
Isabel Irving
Herbert Kelcey
W.J. LeMoyne
Sarah Cowell Le Moyne
Enid Leslie
Mary Mannering
Edward J. Morgan
Kate Pattison-Selten
Annie Russell
Morton Selten
Effie Shannon
E.H. Sothern
Sam Sothern
Ernest Tarleton
Elizabeth “Bessie” Tyree
Charles Walcot
Mrs. Charles Walcot
Thomas Whiffen
Mrs. Thomas “Blanche” Whiffen

Among the married couples in the company were:

William Faversham and Julie Opp
James K. Hackett and Mary Mannering
Herbert Kelcey and Effie Shannon
Morton Selten and Kate Pattison-Selten
E.H. Sothern and Virginia Harned
Mr. and Mrs. Charles Walcot
Mr. and Mrs. Thomas Whiffen

Presentations
Over 80 plays were presented at the Lyceum, not counting dozens of benefits, concerts, lectures, amateur and student productions, short-stay touring performances, and revivals of these plays in repertory. (WP=world premiere, AP=American premiere.)

Dakolar, Steele Mackaye, 4/6/1885.
In Spite of All, Steele Mackaye after Victorien Sardou, 9/15/1885.
One of Our Girls, Bronson Howard, 1/10/1885. 200 performances.
The Highest Bidder, J. Maddison Morton, 5/3/1887. WP, first D. Frohman/Belasco production.
Editha's Burglar, Frances Hodgson Burnett and George Flemine, 9/19/1887.
The Wife, David Belasco and Henry DeMille, 11/1/1887. WP, 239 perfs.
Lord Chumley, Henry De Mille and David Belasco, 8/21/1888. WP.
Sweet Lavender, Arthur Wing Pinero, 11/13/1888. AP, 100+ perfs.
The Marquis, Sardou, 3/18/1889.
The Charity Ball, David Belasco and Henry DeMille, 11/19/1889, WP, 200 perfs.
The Maister of Woodbarrow, Jerome K. Jerome, 8/26/1890. AP.
The Idler, C. Haddon Chambers, 11/11/1890. WP.
Nerves, J. Comyns Carr, 1/19/1891. AP.
Old Heads and Young Hearts, Dion Boucicault, 4/6/1891.
The Dancing Girl, Henry Arthur Jones, 8/31/1891. AP.
Lady Bountiful, Arthur Wing Pinero, 11/16/1891. AP.
Squire Kate, adapted by Robert Buchanan, 1/18/1892.
Merry Gotham, Elisabeth Marbury, 3/14/1892. WP.
Captain Lettarblair, Marguerite Merrington, 8/16/1892. WP.
Americans Abroad, Sardou, 12/5/1892.
The Guardsman, George R. Sims and Cecil Raleigh, 4/3/1893.
Sheridan, or the Maid of Bath, Paul Potter, 9/5/1893.
Our Country Cousins, Paul Potter, 1/8/1894. WP.
The Amazons, Arthur Wing Pinero, 2/19/1894. AP, 100+ perfs.
The Case of Rebellious Susan, Henry Arthur Jones, 12/29/1894.
The Prisoner of Zenda, Edward E. Rose, 9/4/1895. 200 perfs.
The Home Secretary, R. C. Carton, 11/25/1895. AP.
An Enemy to the King, R.N. Stephens, 9/1/1896. 103 perfs.
The Late Mr. Castello, Sydney Grundy, 12/14/1896.
The First Gentleman of Europe, Frances Hodgson Burnett and George Fleming, 1/25/1897.
The Mysterious Mr. Bugle, Madeleine Lucette Ryley, 4/19/1897.
The Princess and the Butterfly, Arthur Wing Pinero, 11/23/1897.
The Tree of Knowledge, R. C. Carton, 1/24/1898.
The Moth and the Flame, Clyde Fitch, 4/11/1898.
The Adventure of Lady Ursula, Anthony Hope, 9/1/1898.
Trelawny of the 'Wells', Arthur Wing Pinero, 11/22/1898. AP, 131 perfs.
His Excellency the Governor, Capt. Robert Marshall, 5/9/1899. First post-Lyceum Stock Company production.
Miss Hobbs, Jerome K. Jerome, 9/7/1899. 158 perfs.
My Daughter-in-Law, Paul Bilhaud and Michel Carré, 2/26/1900.
A Royal Family, Capt. Robert Marshall, 9/5/1900. 175 perfs.
The Love Match, Sydney Grundy, 10/12/1901.
The Girl and the Judge, Clyde Fitch, 12/4/1901. Last production at the old Lyceum Theatre, 125 perfs.

References

Notes

Bibliography

Belasco, David, "My Life's Story", Hearst's Magazine, serialized, vols. 24–28, Mar. 1914-Dec. 1915.
Brown, Thomas Allston, A History of the New York Stage From the First Performance in 1732 to 1901, vol. III, (New York: Dodd, Mead & Company), 1903.
Chapman, John, and Garrison P. Sherwood, eds., The Best Plays of 1894-1899, (New York: Dodd, Mead, & Company), 1955.
Frohman, Daniel, ‘’Memories of a Manager: Reminiscences of the Old Lyceum and of Some Players of the Last Quarter Century,’’ (London [printed in NY]: W. Heinemann), 1911.
Mantle, Burns, and Garrison P. Sherwood, eds., The Best Plays of 1899-1909, (Philadelphia: The Blakiston Company), 1944.
Wickham, Glynne, A History of the Theatre, 2nd Edition, (London: Phaedon Press Limited), 1999.
Winter, William, ed. by William Jefferson Winter, The Life of David Belasco, Volume 1, (New York: Moffat, Yard), 1918.

External links
American Academy of Dramatic Arts
Belasco, "My Life's Story", via Google Books
Brown, A History of the New York Stage, via Google Books
Frohman, Memories of a Manager, via Google Books

Winter, Life of Belasco, via Google Books
The Theaters of New York, photo of Lyceum
Louis Comfort Tiffany design for Lyceum interior

Former Broadway theatres
Former theatres in Manhattan
Demolished theatres in New York City
Demolished buildings and structures in Manhattan
Buildings and structures demolished in 1902